Basel German or  is the dialect of the city of Basel, Switzerland. 
The dialect of Basel forms a Low Alemannic linguistic exclave in the High Alemannic region.

Phonetics and phonology

Consonants

Aspirated plosives 
Basel German is characterised by aspirates  which are absent or at least less common in other dialects. Thus, Basel German did not complete the second Germanic sound shift (High German consonant shift). Typically, words from Standard German or Latin are pronounced with aspirated , too, which is not or only to a lesser extent done in other dialects.

Affricates 

Examples:  ('pan'),  ('tooth'),  ('German'),  ('stupid person', traditional word),  ('jacket', traditional word),  ('to understand', from English to check).

Pronunciation of  phoneme 
Traditionally,  is voiceless , and it may sometimes be described as a lenis . The pronunciation per se seems to derive from French (originally Parisian), and was probably re-interpreted as a lenis  according to Basel German phonology. Not surprisingly, French influence was for a long time dominant in Basel, with well-to-do families speaking French even at home.

Lenition of consonants 
Basel German also has more lenis sounds in word-initial position—for example,  ('day').

Lenis plosives 
Lenis plosives are however all voiceless; whereas fortis plosives are long or geminated. They are (like other lenis or short consonants) always preceded by long vowels, with the possible exception of unstressed vowels. According to Pilch, vowel length is not distinctive; however, vowel length is not always predictable:  'to guess' has both a long vowel and a long/geminated consonant.

Phonemically speaking,  may also be (more traditionally) transcribed , or as unvoiced .

Fortis consonants 
Fortis or long consonants in general are more stable than in other dialects—'to swim' is always , whereas it is pronounced with only a short  in other dialects. This is probably because in stressed words, short vowels only appear before double or geminated/long consonants. Hence, a word like  is not possible in Basel German. As in other dialects, the difference between fortis and lenis is in length. Pilch (180) however interprets  as alveolar, not long.
However,  voicing is always absent.

Examples:  ('to swim'),  ('to pack'),  ('to squeeze'),  ('to guess' — note the long  followed by fortis )

Vowels

Unrounding of vowels 
Unrounding was also typical, but now it has been abandoned by many speakers. Lengthening of vowels is also found, linking it more closely to Standard German than all other Swiss German dialects.

Examples:  ('good day';  in other dialects, still more common),  ('hell', now rounded form more common),  ('biggest, greatest'; now  more common).

Lengthening and shortening of vowels 
Lengthening always occurs before lenis (short) consonants, for example in words like  ('day'),  ('listen'),  ('we'). Those speakers who use this pronunciation lack one minimal pair, since  also translates as 'crouch'.

Velarisation of MHG  
For example,   'street'.

Vowels before  
Typically (but not exclusively) open vowels occur before ; for example,  ('ear') has the allophone , not . Both  and  only occur before  in native words.

Additionally, vowels before  are always long, with the exception of loan words such as  'sorry',  'curry' as well as unstressed vowels.

Examples:   'ear',   'honour'.

Pronunciation of   
Examples:  ('bag'),  ('Basel').

Diphthongs 
Suter (1992: 11) posits only one diphthong , pronounced . In exclamations and few other words,  also exist.

Examples:  ('alone'),  ('to turn'),  ('three'),  ('to build'),  ('blue'),  ('four'),  ('shut'),  ('new');  ('traditional').

Sociolinguistics
Unlike other dialects, Basel German features a rather strong dichotomy between the traditional form—Baseldytsch, used especially for the Carnival of Basel (Basler Fasnacht)—and normal spoken language. Some speakers prefer to use the more traditional variety in written form. The traditional variety is normally associated with the upper classes and with Fasnacht. Like other Swiss German dialects, Basel German has (at least in Basel) more prestige than Standard German, and it is now even used in churches.

Spelling
Examples:  ('to push'),  (typical sweet cookie; but also ),  ('bag'; but sometimes also ),  ('bag', traditional word). The fortis  is always spelled like lenis , namely .

However, words where the aspirates derive from a lenis consonant plus  are usually written as lenis plus , e.g.,  'to keep',  'to fall'.

Terminology
Baslerdüütsch may be used in other dialects.

Bibliography 
 Muster, Hans Peter and Beatrice Bürkli Flaig. 2001. Baselbieter Wörterbuch. Basel: Christoph Merian Verlag. 
 Pilch, Herbert. 1977. "Baseldeutsche Phonologie. Auf Grundlage der Intonation" In: Phonetica 34: 165-190.
 Suter, Rudolf. 1976. Baseldeutsch-Grammatik. Basel: Merian.
 Suter, Rudolf. 1992. Baseldeutsch-Wörterbuch. 3rd edition. Basel: Merian.

Swiss German language
Basel
Basel-Stadt
German dialects